The 1986 United States Senate election in Maryland was held on November 4, 1986. Incumbent Republican U.S. Senator Charles Mathias Jr. decided to retire, instead of seeking a fourth term. Democratic U.S. Representative Barbara Mikulski defeated Reagan Administration official Linda Chavez for the open seat.

Democratic primary

Candidates
 Barbara Mikulski, U.S. Congresswoman and nominee for Senator in 1974
 Michael D. Barnes, U.S. Congressman
 Harry Hughes, Governor of Maryland
 Debra Hanania Freeman
 Edward M. Olszewski
 A. Robert Kaufman, social organizer
 Boyd E. Sweatt, perennial candidate
 Leonard E. Trout, Jr.

Results

Republican primary

Candidates
 Linda Chavez, Assistant to the President for Public Liaison
 Mike Schaefer, former San Diego city councilman
 George Haley, former Kansas State Senator
 Melvin Perkins, perennial candidate
 Nicholas T. Nonnenmacher
 Richard Sullivan
 Howard D. Greyber, perennial candidate
 Monroe Cornish, perennial candidate
 Herbert Stone Rosenberg
 Horace Stuart Rich
 Abraham H. Kalish

Results

General election

Candidates
 Linda Chavez (R), Assistant to the President for Public Liaison
 Barbara Mikulski (D), U.S. Congresswoman

Campaign
Mathias announced his retirement from politics. At the time of this announcement, it was expected that then-Governor Harry Hughes would run for the seat being vacated by retiring Senator Mathias. However, Hughes became caught up in the aftermath of the Maryland savings and loan crisis. He lost popularity with voters, opening the door for Mikulski's bid for the Senate.

Chavez won the primary handily, defeating several Republican challengers. Later, she made comments that some Mikulski supporters interpreted as an attempt to draw attention to the issue of Mikulski's sexual orientation. In an article quoting Chavez's claim that Mikulski was a "San Francisco-style, George McGovern, liberal Democrat", The Washington Post reported that Chavez was directly implying that the never-married Mikulski was a lesbian. Chavez was accused of making Mikulski's sexual orientation a central issue of the political campaign. In defending her use of the phrase, Chavez stated the line "San Francisco Democrats" was a reference to Jeane Kirkpatrick's 1984 Republican National Convention "Blame America First" speech, in which Kirkpatrick coined the phrase "San Francisco Liberal.". The phrase "San Francisco liberal" was common at the time.

Mikulski never directly responded to the issue and eventually won the race with 61 percent of the vote.  She was the first female Democrat elected to the U.S. Senate in her own right (not appointed or filling a seat of a deceased husband).

Results

See also 
 1986 United States Senate elections

References 

1986 Maryland elections
Maryland
1986